The Jacob Critz House is a c. 1835 center-hall house in Thompson's Station, Tennessee, United States. It was listed on the National Register of Historic Places in 1988. The property was covered in a 1988 study of Williamson County historical resources.

The home was likely leased in 1866 by carpetbagger James Wood King in his attempt to raise cotton in the south after the American Civil War.

See also
Thomas L. Critz House, also in Thompson's Station and listed on the National Register of Historic Places

References
 Faust, Eric R. Conspicuous Gallantry: The Civil War and Reconstruction Letters of James W. King, 11th Michigan Volunteer Infantry. Kent, OH: Kent State University Press, 2015.

Notes

Central-passage houses in Tennessee
Houses completed in 1835
Houses in Williamson County, Tennessee
Houses on the National Register of Historic Places in Tennessee
National Register of Historic Places in Williamson County, Tennessee